Animal protectionism is a position within animal rights theory that favors incremental change in pursuit of non-human animal interests. It is contrasted with abolitionism, the position that human beings have no moral right to use animals, and ought to have no legal right, no matter how the animals are treated.

Animal protectionists agree with abolitionists that the animal welfare model of animal protection—whereby animals may be used as food, clothing, entertainment and in experiments so long as their suffering is regulated—has failed ethically and politically, but argue that its philosophy can be reformulated. Robert Garner of the University of Leicester, a leading academic protectionist, argues that animal use may in some circumstances be justified, though it should be better regulated, and that the pursuit of better treatment and incremental change is consistent with holding an abolitionist ideology. Gary Francione, professor of law at Rutgers School of Law-Newark and a leading abolitionist, calls this approach "new welfarism." He regards it as counter-productive because it wrongly persuades the public that the animals they use are being treated kindly, and that continued use is therefore justifiable. Francione regards the abolitionist position as the only one that can properly be called animal rights.


Arguments
One of the arguments put forward by abolitionists against protectionism is that small improvements in animal welfare serve to salve consciences by persuading the public that their use of animals is not unethical. Welfare reform can therefore be counter-productive. Abolitionists also argue that real reform is invariably unsuccessful, because industries that depend on animal use will not implement change that harms their profit margin. That is, the property status of animals prohibits reform that will harm their owners' interests. For that reason, abolitionists argue, it is the property status of animals that must be removed.

Robert Garner argues against this that welfare reform is not simply a staging post on the way to abolition, but is in itself desirable. An approach that is based on the right of animals not to suffer could, in theory, be satisfied with a welfare system in which animal suffering, if not animal use, was minimized, though he concedes that this is unlikely. He also argues that Francione has not shown that improvements in welfare persuade the public that all is well. Rather, he argues, reform has the effect of raising public consciousness about the interests of animals.

See also
 Conservation biology
 Animal rights
 Animal welfare
 List of animal rights advocates
 Tokugawa Tsunayoshi

Notes

References

Francione, Gary L. and Garner, Robert. The Animal Rights Debate. Columbia University Press, 2010.

Animal rights
Animal ethics
Conservation biology